The pelagic butterfish, Schedophilus maculatus, is a medusafish of the genus Schedophilus found in all warm oceans. Its length is up to about 30 cm.

References

 Tony Ayling & Geoffrey Cox, Collins Guide to the Sea Fishes of New Zealand, (William Collins Publishers Ltd, Auckland, New Zealand 1982) 

Centrolophidae
Fish described in 1860
Taxa named by Albert Günther